

List of Rulers of baRôlông

Territory located in present-day Botswana and South Africa.

Kgôsikgolo = Paramount Chief

At this point the Barolong found themselves separated by the Botswana - South Africa border. There are other Barolong in South Africa with different leaders but emanating from the same ancestry.

See also
Botswana
Heads of state of Botswana
Heads of government of Botswana
List of commissioners of Bechuanaland
Rulers of baKgatla
Rulers of baKwêna
Rulers of Balete (baMalete)
Rulers of baNgwaketse
Rulers of Bangwato (bamaNgwato)
Rulers of baTawana
Rulers of baTlôkwa
Lists of office-holders

References

Botswana chiefs